Euretta Cecilia de Cosson Rathbone (died 2003) was a British champion ski racer and a patron of the arts.

Rettles, as she was known, was born in Cairo, Egypt to the British head of Egypt's public works Claude Augustin de Cosson and Euretta Kirkbride, a Philadelphian descendant of a long line of Philadelphia Quakers. Her grandfather was a baron. She took up skiing while in finishing school in Switzerland. She became captain of the British ski team and won several events.

She won a combined event in 1939. She suffered a concussion in competition on Baldy Mountain in 1941.

She married art museum director Perry T. Rathbone in 1945. She died in 2003 after being hit by a bus. She had three children and seven grandchildren.

References

Year of birth missing
2003 deaths
British female alpine skiers
Sportspeople from Cairo
Road incident deaths in California